The Sendai Girls Junior Championship is a women's professional wrestling championship, the secondary singles championship in Sendai Girls' Pro Wrestling. The title is currently vacant.

Reigns

Combined reigns

References

External links

Sendai Girls' Pro Wrestling official site, in Japanese
Purolove site, in German

Women's professional wrestling championships
Professional wrestling in Japan